Lin Junsheng ( born 18 January 1985) is a former Chinese-born Hong Kong professional footballer. His usual positions are centre-back and right-back.

Club career
He joined South China in 2008 and was subsequently loaned to Pegasus. Unfortunately, he was released by Pegasus at the end of the 2008–2009 season.

Career statistics

Club
As of 11 September 2009

External links 
 

1985 births
Living people
Chinese footballers
Hong Kong footballers
Association football defenders
Expatriate footballers in Hong Kong
Chinese expatriate sportspeople in Hong Kong
G.D. Lam Pak players
Footballers at the 2006 Asian Games
Kitchee SC players
South China AA players
TSW Pegasus FC players
Tai Chung FC players
Happy Valley AA players
R&F (Hong Kong) players
Hong Kong First Division League players
Hong Kong Premier League players
Asian Games competitors for China
Liga de Elite players